Stephen Mahamudu Yakubu is a Ghanaian diplomat /Politician and a member of the New Patriotic Party of Ghana. He is currently Ghana's ambassador to the Kingdom of Morocco.

Ambassadorial appointment 
In July 2017, President Nana Akuffo-Addo named Stephen Yakubu as Ghana's ambassador to the Kingdom of Morocco. He was among twenty two other distinguished Ghanaians who were named to head various diplomatic Ghanaian mission in the world.

References

Year of birth missing (living people)
Living people
New Patriotic Party politicians
Ambassadors of Ghana to Morocco